Endomondo was a social fitness network created by Endomondo LLC which allowed users to track their fitness and health statistics with a mobile application and website. Endomondo launched in 2007 with the goal of motivating people to lead healthier lives.

History
Endomondo started in Denmark in 2007 by Mette Lykke, Christian Birk and Jakob Nordenhof Jønck. In 2011, the company opened an office in Silicon Valley, USA, but kept its research and development department in Denmark. In 2013, Endomondo LLC was listed in Red Herring as a European finalists for promising start-ups. The same year, Christian Birk and Jakob Nordenhof Jønck left the daily operation of the company, but kept co-ownership. 

In February 2015, Endomondo LLC was acquired by athletic apparel maker Under Armour for $85 million. Endomondo, at that time, had over 20 million users.

In October 2020, Under Armour announced that Endomondo would be shutting down and selling off MyFitnessPal to the private equity firm Francisco Partners for $345 million. Service stopped on 31 December 2020, giving customers until 15 February 2021 to download an archive of their historic data.

Features
Endomondo could track numerous fitness attributes such as running routes, distance, duration, and calories. The software could help analyze performance and recommend improvements.

There was a free and a paid version available of Endomondo. The free version had advertisements. The paid Premium version was free of advertisements and included additional features such as the possibility to create one's own training plan. The offering of additional features was different between the Android, IOS and Windows platforms, and had significantly better features for tracking performance over time than UnderArmours suggested replacement. 

Endomondo offered challenges of various types to the user and allowed users to create their own challenges.

References

External links

GPS sports tracking applications
Mobile social software
American health websites
Fitness apps
IOS software
Android (operating system) software
Windows Phone software
BlackBerry software
Web applications
2007 software